"Since Yesterday" is a song performed by Scottish synth-pop duo Strawberry Switchblade, the lead single from their self-titled album. It became their only major hit.

Background and composition

"Since Yesterday" (primarily written by Rose McDowall) was written during the early days of the band. The song was initially called "Dance" and was debuted at their live shows in 1981-82. The only recording of "Dance" that survives is of a David Jensen BBC session the band did in October 1982, when they were still unsigned. While the musical structure stayed the same, the lyrics were extensively rewritten by McDowall when the duo recorded their debut album, and was eventually retitled "Since Yesterday".

In 2015, McDowall revealed that the song is about nuclear war. Other interpretations included a theme of suicide.

The track's opening fanfare came from the third movement of Sibelius's Symphony No. 5 - the Finale ~1.20 from the start. The duo worked with producer David Motion and the song presented a musical change from the group, whose previous single, "Trees and Flowers", had a folk-pop sound, while "Since Yesterday" and their later album saw them embrace the synth-pop and new wave sound which was more current with the times. The single's two non-album b-sides, "By the Sea" and a cover of The Velvet Underground's "Sunday Morning", were, just like their first single, produced by David Balfe and retained that folk-pop sound of "Trees and Flowers", however.

Release and reception

After releasing their debut single, "Trees and Flowers", on an independent label, the duo were signed to Korova, a sub-label of the Warner Music Group. "Since Yesterday" was chosen as the group's debut single for the label, in October 1984. The song initially failed to become a success, entering the UK charts at #89 at the end of October. However, it slowly climbed the charts (although never breaking the top 40) until the end of the year. After the Christmas period, Warners executive Rob Dickins decided to push more aggressively the publicity machine for the single, which had by then peaked at #47, and TV adverts for the single were produced, as well as several TV and magazine appearances. The marketing push worked, and the single cracked the UK top 40 in the second week of January 1985, climbing to #5 two weeks later. The single eventually spent 20 weeks on the UK charts, about twice as many weeks a top 10 single spent in the charts at that time.

Internationally, the song peaked at #6 in Ireland and at #24 in the Netherlands. It was released around continental Europe, Australia and Canada, but it failed to chart. The song was a big hit in Japan, where the group found their biggest fanbase, both for their music and for their lolita-esque image.

Music video

The duo's first music video, directed by Tim Pope, presented them with the image they're most associated with: heavy goth-like make-up and eyeliner, polka-dot dresses, and many bows and ribbons in their hair. The video was shot partially in black and white and partially in colour: the group in black and white were dancing in a studio, surrounded by coloured dots hanging on mobiles or moving around the duo using the stop motion technique.

Track listings
 7" Single
 "Since Yesterday" 2:57
 "By the Sea" 2:57

 12" Single
 "Since Yesterday" 2:57
 "By the Sea" 2:57
 "Sunday Morning" 2:16

The extended version of "Since Yesterday" was released on a 12" remix album first released in Japan in 1985.

Charts

References

1984 singles
1984 songs
Songs about nuclear war and weapons
Strawberry Switchblade songs
Korova (record label) singles